The Hometown Band was a Canadian folk music group.  They are best known as the backup band for Valdy.

History
The Hometown Band was founded in 1975 by Claire Lawrence, a former member of The Collectors and Chilliwack, as the back-up group for Canadian folk artist Valdy. The band comprised Shari Ulrich (lead vocals, flute, fiddle), Geoff Eyre (drums, vocals), Robbie King (organ, piano, keyboard bass), and Doug Edwards (guitar, keyboards, bass).

Their first LP Flying was released in 1976, and produced two hit singles, the title track and "I'm Ready" (both written by the Pied Pumkin's Joe Mock.)

In 1977 Eddie Patterson joined the group, and they recorded a second album, titled The Hometown Band.

The group toured with Valdy in 1977, and continued to tour in 1978. That year the band won the Juno Award for "Most Promising Group of the Year",

The band's second album failed to produce a radio hit, and the band broke up soon after.

Following the band's breakup, Shari Ulrich played in several other groups as well as solo performances. She and Joe Mock continued to perform occasionally with The Pied Pumkin.

The Hometown Band reunited with Valdy in 2016 for a 40th anniversary tour.

Discography

Albums

References

External links
 Canadian Bands biography
 Pacific Northwest Bands - The Hometown Band, Vancouver, B.C.
 Museum of Canadian Music - Hometown Band

Canadian rock music groups
Juno Award for Breakthrough Group of the Year winners